The 1977–78 Divisional Championship was the first edition of a new event in England's rugby calendar, played in its entirety across three weeks in December 1977. During the first season of the competition, there were sub-divisional trial matches held among the four divisions prior to the semi-final stage.

In the championship's first final, held on 17 December 1977 at Twickenham, the North beat the Midlands 22-7, while earlier in the day London beat the South & South-West 22–15 in the play-off for third and fourth place.

Results

Inter-Divisional round

Semi-finals

3rd/4th play-off

Final

Report

The four Lions in the North's pack - Beaumont, Cotton, Dixon and Neary - played a large part in their side's success. Additionally Malcolm Young upheld his England status with a lively display at scrum-half and Caplan, who was later to win his first cap, showed his capabilities as an attacking full-back by scoring two tries. The best moment of the match came in the second half when Maxwell, the North centre, burst clean through past Corless from just inside halfway for a superb individual try. Altogether seven of the North team were picked for the first international (of the 1978 Five Nations), against France.

Horton, the Lancashire fly-half, opened the scoring in the ninth minute with a well-taken dropped goal for the North, to which Hare replied with a mammoth penalty goal from a metre inside his own half for the Midlands. An unconverted try by Caplan, taking an inside pass from Carleton, gave the North a lead of 7–3 at half-time. From then on they forged further ahead with a penalty goal by Young, a second try by Caplan, converted by Young, and Maxwell's splendid try, which Caplan converted from wide out. At 22-3 the match was virtually over, but the Midlands had the last word. From a short penalty, Cooper, Corless and Dodge moved the ball rapidly to Knee, who ran in for an unconverted try near the corner.

References

Divisional Championship
Divisional Championship (rugby union)